Agathon is a genus of net-winged midges in the family Blephariceridae. There are about 19 described species in Agathon.

Species
These 19 species belong to the genus Agathon:

 Agathon arizonicus (Alexander, 1958) i c g
 Agathon aylmeri (Garrett, 1923) i c g
 Agathon bilobatoides (Kitakami, 1931) c g
 Agathon bispinus (Kitakami, 1931) c g
 Agathon comstocki (Kellogg, 1903) i c g b
 Agathon decorilarva (Brodskij, 1954) c g
 Agathon dismalea (Hogue, 1970) i c g
 Agathon doanei (Kellogg, 1900) i c g
 Agathon elegantulus Roder, 1890 i c g
 Agathon eoasiaticus (Brodskij, 1954) c g
 Agathon ezoensis (Kitakami, 1950) c
 Agathon iyaensis (Kitakami, 1931) c g
 Agathon japonicus (Alexander, 1922) c g
 Agathon kawamurai (Kitakami, 1950) c g
 Agathon longispinus (Kitakami, 1931) c g
 Agathon markii (Garrett, 1925) i c g
 Agathon montanus (Kitakami, 1931) c g
 Agathon sequoiarum (Alexander, 1952) i c g
 Agathon setosus Zwick & Arefina, 2005 c g

Data sources: i = ITIS, c = Catalogue of Life, g = GBIF, b = Bugguide.net

References

Further reading

 

Blephariceridae
Articles created by Qbugbot
nematocera genera